The Central and Western District Recreation and Sports Association, known simply as Central & Western District, is a Hong Kong football club based in Central and Western District, one of the 18 districts of Hong Kong. The team currently competes in the Hong Kong First Division.

The club's home matches are played at Happy Valley Recreation Ground and various other grounds as there are no suitable grounds in Central and Western District.

History
In the 2002–03 season, the Hong Kong Football Association reformed the Hong Kong Second Division and the Hong Kong Third Division. The association suggested that each of the different district councils form their own football team based in its district. The Central and Western District Council therefore complied and entered a team in that season's Hong Kong Third District Division League, the bottom tier of the Hong Kong football league pyramid.

In the 2012–13 season, the club finished 8th in the Hong Kong Fourth Division, and in the 2013–14 season, the club finished 3rd in the final season of the Fourth Division before it was renamed the Third Division. The club has finished 2nd in the Third Division in the 2014–15 season, but it was not promoted due to unknown reasons.

Following a 2nd place finish in the 2015–16 season, the club was promoted to the Hong Kong Second Division. The club has also reached Round 3 of the 2015-16 Hong Kong FA Cup Preliminary Round, getting knocked out by Wanchai 2–1.

In the 2016–17 season, Central & Western started the season with a 14-game unbeaten run in all competitions before falling to Sun Hei in the Quarter-final of the HKFA Cup Preliminary Round. They scored two thumping victories against Kwong Wah, once 6–0 in the league and the other 4–0 in the HKFA Cup Preliminary Round. Their unbeaten run lasted from September to March for 15 games in the league, before being beaten by eventual champions Sparta Rotterdam Mutual 1–0 in Happy Valley and Lucky Mile 2–0 in the next game. However, the club missed out a second promotion in 2 years by +2 goal difference from Hoi King which also finished with 43 points.

In the 2017–18 season, the club achieved promotion to the Hong Kong First Division by coming second in the league with 51 points, 5 more than third place Tuen Mun.

Coaching staff

|}

Honours

League
Hong Kong Second Division
Runners-up (1): 2017–18
Hong Kong Third Division
Runners-up (1): 2015–16

External links
 Central & Western at HKFA

Football clubs in Hong Kong
Hong Kong First Division League
2002 establishments in Hong Kong
Association football clubs established in 2002